is a Japanese animation studio that specializes in the production of anime. The studio's main jobs are as a sub-contracting company.

Establishment
After working with Tsuchida Production, Ayumi Enomoto joined Studio Fantasia as a producer. Studio Fantasia was reformed into two divisions, and, later, the first of Fantasia's two studios became independent as Chaos Project, with Ayumi as the head.

Works
The list below is a list of Chaos Project's works as a lead animation studio.

Anime television series

OVAs

References

External links
 

Animation studios in Tokyo
Mass media companies established in 1995
Japanese animation studios
1995 establishments in Japan